Kris Taylor (born 12 January 1984) is an English football manager and former professional player who is a player-coach at  club Chasetown.

Primarily as a left-sided midfielder, he never made the first team at Manchester United and instead went on to spend over three seasons at Walsall after signing in February 2003. He spent two seasons at Hereford United from 2007 to 2009, before moving on to Port Vale for another two season spell. Following this he signed with non-league Darlington in June 2011, before his contract was terminated in January 2012. He signed with AFC Telford United in August 2012, and was loaned out to Hednesford Town in March 2013. His move to Hednesford was permanent three months later after he helped the club to win the Birmingham Senior Cup and the Northern Premier League play-off final. He continued playing for the club after beating testicular cancer in 2014, representing Hednesford Town, Rushall Olympic, Stafford Rangers, Sutton Coldfield Town, and Romulus. He served Walsall Wood as manager from November 2019 to January 2020. He then returned to playing with Chasetown.

Playing career

Walsall
Taylor was born in Cannock and was originally on the books of Wolves; he was signed by Manchester United at the age of 14 for a fee of £200,000. He signed his first professional contract on 26 January 2001, but never played for the first team. He left Old Trafford in February 2003, having featured three times for the reserves, and joined Walsall.

Initially playing for the reserves at Walsall, he went on to score on his first team debut on 31 January 2004 in a 3–2 defeat away at Stoke City. He went on to make a further ten first-team appearances for the club that season and was retained upon the season's conclusion, signing a one-year deal. Walsall having been relegated in 2003–04, Taylor could still not break into the team in League One. After three cup and three league appearances early in 2004–05 he was put on the transfer list by Paul Merson. Taylor went out on loan to Burton Albion in December, after he caught the eye of Nigel Clough during a Birmingham Senior Cup match with Burton. He impressed at Eton Park, making a total of six appearances and scoring four goals. He scored a memorable goal from 35 yards against Tamworth, and also scored against his future club Hereford in a 3–0 win. He scored four goals in six games for the Conference club, making a massive impact in his five weeks in Burton. On his return to the Bescot Stadium an offer from Carlisle United was rejected, and he signed a new two-year contract at the end of the season.

He was a regular in the first team in the first half of the 2005–06 season, before returning to Burton Albion in early January. This time the loan lasted until the end of the season, though Taylor didn't manage to find the form he reached in his previous loan spell. He scored four goals in fifteen games before returning to Walsall in time for the last game of the season. Walsall were relegated once again in 2005–06, leaving them in League Two for 2006–07 season. He hit forty games for the "Swifts", helping the club achieve promotion as champions. Taylor was not rewarded for his efforts and was instead told to look for a new club by "Saddlers" boss Richard Money.

Hereford United
In July 2007, he signed for Hereford United. In his first season with the club he was noted for his versatility, playing at left back, left midfield and central midfield. In similar form to the previous season, Taylor put in a forty-game season to help his club win promotion to League One, this time with a third-place finish. In contrast to his experience with Walsall, Taylor stayed with the "Bulls" for the 2008–09 campaign. He played 43 games, though could do little to prevent the "Whites" suffering relegation with a last place finish, 14 points off safety. Holding out on the club's offer of a new contract, he left the club in the summer of 2009 in search of pastures new.

Port Vale
In July 2009 he went out on trial at League Two side Port Vale, and scored from around 20 yards in a 7–0 win over Rocester in a pre-season friendly. He impressed manager Micky Adams on his trial and would have been signed to a contract if the cash-strapped club could find the finance; instead Adams offered Taylor non-contract terms, he signed a short-term deal in early August. This was not enough for Taylor, who resolved to win a long-term contract with the club. His man-of-the-match performances also persuaded Adams to try to hold on to him. On 25 August he went a long way towards achieving this goal, scoring a wonder goal in a 2–0 win over Sheffield Wednesday in the League Cup Second Round.

Unable to find the cash to fund Taylor's wages, the club were aided by a £5,000 donation from 'Vale Volunteers', raised specifically by fans to keep Taylor at the club. He was transfer listed in late September, along with the entire Port Vale squad, after manager Micky Adams saw his team slip to a third consecutive defeat. His second goal of the season came in the local derby at Crewe Alexandra, Taylor scoring the winner in a 2–1 victory. In October 2009 he signed a new deal that would keep him at the club until the end of the season. He made 49 appearances throughout the season, as his club finished just outside the play-offs. He was offered a new one-year contract by the club at the end of the season, which he quickly signed. His manager explained that Taylor's inconsistency prevented a longer contract offer, and Taylor accepted the explanation.

He made a slow start to the 2010–11 campaign, but in November declared he aimed to re-establish himself into the first team. He got his opportunity to shine when left-back Lee Collins was out of action for a month with split shins. Ending the season with just twenty league appearances throughout the season, he was released from the club in May 2011. Adams said that he had faith in Taylor's ability, but that he hadn't played enough games in 2010–11 to justify a new contract.

Non-League
In June 2011, he signed with Darlington of the Conference National on a one-year contract. Manager Mark Cooper stated that "It's a big signing for us, Kris has a great range of passing and is a set-piece specialist, he's certainly a player who will excite." Darlington suffered financial difficulties during Taylor's time at the club and his contract was terminated on 16 January 2012, along with the rest of the playing squad and caretaker manager Craig Liddle. However a surprise decision meant that the club would continue to complete their remaining fixtures, and Taylor returned to Darlington on a non-contract basis. In August 2012, he returned to Port Vale to train and maintain his match fitness. On 9 August, he signed a one-year deal with Conference club AFC Telford United. Manager Andy Sinton said that "We're very fortunate to get somebody of his calibre".

Taylor joined Northern Premier League side Hednesford Town on loan in March 2013. He was recalled to the Telford squad for the last two games of the season after Ryan Valentine and Dan Preston both picked up injuries. Telford ended the season in last place, and were relegated. Taylor returned to Keys Park to help the "Pitmen" win the Birmingham Senior Cup final against Sutton Coldfield Town and the play-off final against F.C. United of Manchester. The move had been made permanent in June when Taylor signed a one-year contract with Hednesford. He made 36 appearances in the 2013–14 season, as the club reached the play-off semi-finals, where they were beaten by Altrincham. He was released in October 2014. He later played for Rushall Olympic. He joined Stafford Rangers in June 2016, and stated that "I think we're looking at the play-offs as a minimum". However Rangers only managed to finish 13th in the Northern Premier League Premier Division at the end of 2016–17 season. He rejoined Hednesford Town – local rivals to Stafford Rangers – as a player-coach under manager Neil Tooth in May 2017. In May 2017 he was signed by new Sutton Coldfield Town manager Neil Tooth as a player-coach. Four months later he followed Tooth to Romulus. The "Roms" were relegated at the end of the 2017–18 season after finishing bottom of the Northern Premier League Division One South.

After his management spell at Walsall Wood ended, he returned to playing with Chasetown of the Northern Premier League Division One South East, making six appearances in the 2020–21 season. He also worked as a coach at the club. He made 31 appearances in the 2021–22 season, scoring one goal, as he helped the "Scholars" to reach the play-offs. He did not feature in the play-off final defeat to Belper Town.

Management career
Taylor was appointed joint-manager of Midland League Premier Division side Walsall Wood, along with Peter Till, in November 2019. The pair were demoted to assistant managers following the re-appointment of former manager Darren Byfield in January 2020. The 2019–20 season was formally abandoned due to the coronavirus pandemic in England on 26 March 2020, with all results from the season being expunged, and no promotion or relegation taking place to, from, or within the competition.

Style of play
Former Port Vale and Hereford teammate Lee Collins described Taylor as: "really good on the ball and is also good to have around. He filled in at left-back at Hereford, but is also talented in central midfield. He has two good feet, but is particularly strong on his left foot. He's got a good touch and a good passing range."

Early in his career he was a goalscoring midfielder, and in January 2005 said that the left-back spot "isn't really me". In addition to his ability to play down the wings, he can also play as a centre-back if the situation dictates.

Personal life
Taylor is a Manchester United supporter. In January 2011, his fiancée Jenny gave birth to the couple's first child, Lydia.

In January 2014, Taylor was informed he had been diagnosed with testicular cancer. His tumour was removed and after one dose of chemotherapy he returned to playing football within weeks.

He graduated from Manchester Metropolitan University in July 2016 with a bachelor's degree in Sports Science.

Career statistics

Honours
Walsall
League Two: 2006–07

Hereford United
League Two third-place promotion: 2007–08

Hednesford Town
Birmingham Senior Cup: 2013
Northern Premier League play-offs: 2013

References

People from Cannock
English footballers
Association football utility players
Association football fullbacks
Association football midfielders
Manchester United F.C. players
Walsall F.C. players
Burton Albion F.C. players
Hereford United F.C. players
Port Vale F.C. players
Darlington F.C. players
AFC Telford United players
Hednesford Town F.C. players
Rushall Olympic F.C. players
Stafford Rangers F.C. players
Sutton Coldfield Town F.C. players
Romulus F.C. players
Chasetown F.C. players
English Football League players
National League (English football) players
Northern Premier League players
Midland Football League players
Association football coaches
English football managers
Walsall Wood F.C. managers
Alumni of Manchester Metropolitan University
1984 births
Living people